The 2000 Four Continents Figure Skating Championships was an international figure skating competition in the 1999–2000 season. It was held at the Osaka Pool in Osaka, Japan on February 22–27. Medals were awarded in the disciplines of men's singles, ladies' singles, pair skating, and ice dancing.

Medals table

Results

Men

Ladies

Pairs

Ice dancing

External links
 2000 Four Continents Figure Skating Championships
 New York Times - Stojko Surges Past Eldgredge

Four Continents Figure Skating Championships, 2000
Four Continents Figure Skating Championships
Four Continents